Oreokera is a genus of small air-breathing land snails, terrestrial pulmonate gastropod mollusks in the superfamily Punctoidea (according to the taxonomy of the Gastropoda by Bouchet & Rocroi, 2005).

Species
Species within the genus Oreokera include:
 Oreokera cumulus
 Oreokera nimbus

References

 Nomenclator Zoologicus info

 
Charopidae
Taxonomy articles created by Polbot